The WNBA-NBC Champions League is the annual competition for nine-pin bowling women's clubs, organized by the World Ninepin Bowling Association. It is playing since 2002, and the first season the competition was named as Euroleague.

Competition formula 
WNBA-NBC Champions League tournament has a very stable competition formula. The following rules apply:

Qualification 

 12 teams participate in each event.
 Most recent champions are always pre-qualified.
 Top seven teams from the Team World Cup.
 Top three teams from the Team European Cup.
 Winner of the Team NBC Cup.
''Vacant starting-places will occupy after the ranking exclusively with participants of Team's Cups (sequence World-, then European-, then NBC-Cup) until maximum 12 places.

Competition format 

All qualified teams are seeded in the established order to the 12-team bracket. The knock-out ties are played in a two-legged format, with the exception of the final four. The Final Four usually takes place in the weekend at the turn of March and April.

 12-team bracket: 
 7th team of World Cup – 3rd team of European Cup
 NBC Cup winner – 6th team of World Cup
 European Cup winner vs 5th team of World Cup
 4th team of World Cup vs European Cup runner-up
 The title holder and three best teams of the World Cup are seeded and play in the quarter-finals with the winners of the first-round games.
 Title holder
 World Cup winner
 World Cup runner-up
 3rd team of World Cup

Records and statistics

Final Four

Winning clubs

Performances by nation

Notes

References

WNBA-NBC Champions League
Nine-pin bowling competitions
Recurring sporting events established in 2002